Tranmere may refer to:

Australia
Tranmere, Tasmania, a suburb of Hobart
Tranmere, South Australia, a suburb of Adelaide

England
Tranmere, Merseyside
Tranmere Rovers F.C., a football club
Tranmere Oil Terminal, a docking facility on the River Mersey
Tranmere railway station (1846–1857)

See also
Birkenhead and Tranmere (ward), an electoral division of Wirral Council